Grimmia antarctici is a species of moss that grows in areas of Antarctica such as the Windmill Islands. It lives in areas that are not icy, especially on the northern peninsula. Unusually high levels of carbon dioxide have been found in air surrounding this species of moss.

References
Geoecology of Antarctic ice-free coastal landscapes
Handbook of Functional plant ecology

Grimmiales
Flora of Antarctica
Plants described in 1906